Ziyarat Arba'een (Arabic: زیارة الأربعین); "Ziyarat" in Arabic language means pilgrimage while "Arba'een means forty. Ziyarat in Shiite means pilgrimage or visit to pay respect to Imams.  Although, the visitation is not obligatory rites of religion like prayer, fasting and hajj, but it plays an integral role in the religious life of Shia. But technically, Ziyarat Arba'een refers to the 40-day pilgrimage of the holy city of Karbala to mark the 40 day mourning period after the killing of Prophet Muhammad's grandson, Imam Hussain.  The culture as stated by a researcher provides ways to express social emotion  and from sociological perspective, feelings rules are ″appropriate ways to express internal sensation".   So, also the ziyarat is directly or indirectly used to express the mourning of Imams. The Ziyarat Arba'een is a prayer which is usually recited in the Iraqi city of Karbala on the day of Arba'een. It is narrated from Safwan al-Jammaal from Imam Ja'far al-Sadiq, the sixth Shiite Imam in which the Imam instructed him to visit Imam Husayn's mosque, and to recite a specific visitation prayer on Arba'een by which believer should reaffirm their pledge to Husayn's ideals. The Ziyarat or prayer is a text which designates Husayn as the "inheritor" of Adam, Noah, Abraham, Moses and Jesus.

Importance of Ziyarat of Arba'een
The number 40 holds an important status in the light of Islam. Quran emphasized the importance of 40: "And We made an appointment with Moses for thirty nights and perfected them by [the addition of] ten; so the term of his Lord was completed as forty nights. And Moses said to his brother Aaron, "Take my place among my people, do right [by them], and do not follow the way of the corrupters", while the Hadith also reported that the earth mourns a death of believer for forty morning. Also, according to the teachings of Ahlul Bayt, it holds a special spiritual significance. With respect to Imam Hussein, Imam Baqir reported that the heavens wept over Imam Hussein for forty morning, with the sun rising red and setting red.

Duties of the mourners
According to Imam Hasan al-Askari , the signs of a believers are five:
  Performing fifty-one rakats of salaat (prayer) daily,
  Reciting Ziyarah of Arba'een,
  Wearing a ring in the right hand,
  Placing the forehead on dust [during sajda],
  Saying "Bismillah al-rahman al-rahim" aloud in salaat. 
There are some duties that mourners have to observe during forty day of Imam Hussein. They are as follow:
  Ziyaratul Arba'een
  Use the ziyarat to link-up with the Imam and take him as a role model in everything.
  Living in peace with others that are lovers of Imam Hussein
  Rise against the oppression and come to the aid of oppressed.
  Renew our pledge, love and bond with the Ahlul-Bayt.

The text of pilgrimage in Arabic
_بسم اللہ الرحمٰن الرحیم_
اَلسَّلَامُ عَلٰى وَلِيِّ اللّٰهِ وَ حَبِيْبِهِ اَلسَّلَامُ عَلٰى خَلِيْلِ اللّٰهِ وَ نَجِيْبِهِ اَلسَّلَامُ عَلٰى صَفِيِّ اللّٰهِ وَ ابْنِ صَفِيِّهِ اَلسَّلَامُ عَلَى الْحُسَيْنِ الْمَظْلُوْمِ الشَّهِيْدِ اَلسَّلَامُ عَلٰى اَسِيْرِ الْكُرُبَاتِ وَ قَتِيْلِ الْعَبَرَاتِ اَللّٰهُمَّ اِنِّيۤ اَشْهَدُ اَنَّهُ وَلِيُّكَ وَ ابْنُ وَلِيِّكَ وَ صَفِيُّكَ وَ ابْنُ صَفِيِّكَ الْفَاۤئِزُ بِكَرَامَتِكَ اَكْرَمْتَهُ بِالشَّهَادَةِ وَ حَبَوْتَهُ بِالسَّعَادَةِ وَ اجْتَبَيْتَهُ بِطِيْبِ الْوِلَادَةِ وَ جَعَلْتَهُ سَيِّدًا مِنَ السَّادَةِ وَ قَاۤئِدًا مِنَ الْقَادَةِ وَ ذَاۤئِدًا مِنَ الذَّادَةِ وَ اَعْطَيْتَهُ مَوَارِيْثَ الْاَنْبِيَاۤءِ وَ جَعَلْتَهُ حُجَّةً عَلٰى خَلْقِكَ مِنَ الْاَوْصِيَاۤءِ فَاَعْذَرَ فِيْ الدُّعَاۤءِ وَ مَنَحَ النُّصْحَ وَ بَذَلَ مُهْجَتَهُ فِيْكَ لِيَسْتَنْقِذَ عِبَادَكَ مِنَ الْجَهَالَةِ وَ حَيْرَةِ الضَّلَالَةِ وَ قَدْ تَوَازَرَ عَلَيْهِ مَنْ غَرَّتْهُ الدُّنْيَا وَ بَاعَ حَظَّهُ بِالْاَرْذَلِ الْاَدْنٰى وَ شَرٰى اٰخِرَتَهُ بِالثَّمَنِ الْاَوْكَسِ وَ تَغَطْرَسَ وَ تَرَدَّى فِيْ هَوَاهُ وَ اَسْخَطَكَ وَ اَسْخَطَ نَبِيَّكَ، وَ اَطَاعَ مِنْ عِبَادِكَ اَهْلَ الشِّقَاقِ وَ النِّفَاقِ وَ حَمَلَةَ الْاَوْزَارِ الْمُسْتَوْجِبِيْنَ النَّارَ [لِلنَّارِ] فَجَاهَدَهُمْ فِيْكَ صَابِرًا مُحْتَسِبًا حَتّٰى سُفِكَ فِيْ طَاعَتِكَ دَمُهُ وَ اسْتُبِيْحَ حَرِيْمُهُ اَللّٰهُمَّ فَالْعَنْهُمْ لَعْنًا وَبِيْلًا وَ عَذِّبْهُمْ عَذَابًا اَلِيْمًا اَلسَّلَامُ عَلَيْكَ يَا ابْنَ رَسُوْلِ اللّٰهِ اَلسَّلَامُ عَلَيْكَ يَا ابْنَ سَيِّدِ الْاَوْصِيَاۤءِ اَشْهَدُ اَنَّكَ اَمِيْنُ اللّٰهِ وَ ابْنُ اَمِيْنِهِ عِشْتَ سَعِيْدًا وَ مَضَيْتَ حَمِيْدًا وَ مُتَّ فَقِيْدًا مَظْلُوْمًا شَهِيْدًا وَ اَشْهَدُ اَنَّ اللّٰهَ مُنْجِزٌ مَا وَعَدَكَ وَ مُهْلِكٌ مَنْ خَذَلَكَ وَ مُعَذِّبٌ مَنْ قَتَلَكَ وَ اَشْهَدُ اَنَّكَ وَفَيْتَ بِعَهْدِ اللّٰهِ وَ جَاهَدْتَ فِيْ سَبِيْلِهِ حَتّٰىۤ اَتَاكَ الْيَقِيْنُ فَلَعَنَ اللّٰهُ مَنْ قَتَلَكَ وَ لَعَنَ اللّٰهُ مَنْ ظَلَمَكَ وَ لَعَنَ اللّٰهُ اُمَّةً سَمِعَتْ بِذٰلِكَ فَرَضِيَتْ بِهِ، اَللّٰهُمَّ اِنِّيۤ اُشْهِدُكَ اَنِّي وَلِيٌّ لِمَنْ وَالَاهُ وَ عَدُوٌّ لِمَنْ عَادَاهُ بِاَبِيۤ اَنْتَ وَ اُمِّيْ يَا ابْنَ رَسُوْلِ اللّٰهِ اَشْهَدُ اَنَّكَ كُنْتَ نُوْرًا فِي الْاَصْلَابِ الشَّامِخَةِ وَ الْاَرْحَامِ الْمُطَهَّرَةِ [الطَّاهِرَةِ] لَمْ تُنَجِّسْكَ الجاهِلِيَّةُ بِأَنْجاسِها وَلَمْ تُلْبِسْكَ المُدْلَهِمَّاتِ مِنْ ثِيابِها، وَأَشْهَدُ أَنَّكَ مِنْ دَعائِمِ الدِّينِ وَأَرْكانَ المُسْلِمينَ وَمَعْقِلِ المُؤْمِنِينَ، وَأَشْهَدُ أَنَّكَ الإمام البَرُّ التَّقِيُّ الرَّضِيُّ الزَّكِيُّ الهادِي المَهْدِيُّ، وَأَشْهَدُ أَنَّ الأَئِمَّةِ مِنْ وُلْدِكَ كَلِمَةُ التَّقْوى وَأَعْلامِ الهُدى وَالعُرْوَةُ الوُثْقى وَالحُجَّةُ على أَهْلِ الدُّنْيا، وَأَشْهَدُ أَنِّي بِكُمْ مُؤْمِنٌ وَبِإِيَّابِكُمْ مُوقِنٌ بِشَرايِعِ دِينِي وَخَواتِيمِ عَمَلِي وَقَلْبِي لِقَكْبِكُمْ سِلْمٌ وَأَمْرِي لاَمْرِكُمْ مُتَّبِعٌ وَنُصْرَتِي لَكُمْ مُعَدَّةٌ حَتّى يَأْذَنَ الله لَكُمْ ؛ فَمَعَكُمْ مَعَكُمْ لا مَعَ عَدُوِّكُمْ، صَلَواتُ الله عَلَيْكُمْ وَعَلى أَرْواحِكُمْ وَأَجسادِكُمْ وَشاهِدِكُمْ وَغائِبِكُمْ وَظاهِرِكُمْ وَباطِنِكُمْ آمِينَ رَبَّ العالَمِينَ.

The text of pilgrimage
Peace be on the favorite of Allah,  Peace be on the beloved friend of Allah, His distinguished hero! Peace be on the choicest confidant of Allah, sincerely attached precisely like his father! Peace be on Hussain, who gave his life in the way of Allah, a martyr, underwent untold hardships Peace be on the hostage surrounded by the-tightening circle of sorrow and grief, killed by a horde of savages.

O my Allah I give witness that beyond a shadow of doubt he is Thy favorite and choicest confidant, who enjoys Thy confidence and favor, precisely like his father!
Thou looked up to him and elected him in Thy cause, picked and chose him for the good fortune, selected for him the best purified parents, appointed him guardian, leader, and defender of rights, a true representative (inheritor and progenitor) of guardians, leaders and defenders of rights, gave him much and more from the inheritance of the Prophets, put him forward as a decisive argument, along with the other successors (of the Holy Prophet-the twelve lmams) to the mankind. He met with deadly dangers, acted justly and fairly, made use of everything belonging to him to pay full attention to give sincere advice, took pains, made every effort and put his heart, mind, soul and life at the disposal of Thy mission to liberate the people from the yoke of ignorance and evil of bewilderment, but an evildoer, deceived with empty hopes of mean and worthless worldly gains, had pressed heavily on him, and sold out his share (eternal bliss) for the meanest and lowest bargain, betrayed his "day of judgment" for a vulgar return, took pride in insolence, fell into the fathom- well of silly stupid follies, provoked Thee and Thy Prophet to anger, did as the harsh discordant, the hypocrite, the heavily burdened bearers of sin, condemned to Hellfire, advised to him, however, he (the Holy lmam), steadily, rightly and justly coped With them, till, in Thy obedience, gave his life after which his family was set adrift.

O my Allah, therefore, condemn them to hell as a denunciation and conviction; and crack-down on them with a painful Punishment. Peace be on you O the son of the Messenger of Allah! Peace be on you O the son of the first of the successors (of the Holy Prophet)! I bear witness that Allah put faith in you like He had full confidence in your father, and that you always looked for and collected good and virtue, lived a highly praiseworthy life and departed from this world a martyr, forsaken and abused; I bear witness that Allah will promptly fulfill the promise, He made to you, and destroy those who left you helpless and punish those who killed you; I bear witness that you kept your promise made with Allah, and strived in His way till what was certain came upon you, so curse of Allah be an those who killed you, curse of Allah be on those who oppressed you, curse of Allah be on the people who came to know and approved.

O my Allah be my witness that I make friends with those who love him and oppose those who deny him. I, my father and mother, are at your disposal 0 the son of the Messenger of Allah. I know and bear witness that you were "light" in the sublime loins and in the pure wombs, never touched you the dirt of ignorance, nor ever obscurity concealed you in its folds;I bear witness that you are the pillar of "Deen", support of the Muslims, refuge of the faithful; I bear witness that you are a truthful, well-aware, content, intelligent, rightly guided guide (Imam); I bear witness that the Imams among your descendants are the symbols of "conscious piety" and signs of "true guidance",

The "safe handle"-Islam, and the decisive arguments over mankind; I declare positively that I have full faith in you and I know for certain that you shall return. I am, fully committed to the laws of my religion, certain of my deeds, my mind and heart ready for your return, and my affairs carried out in the light of your instructions, till Allah gives you permission, together with you, along with you, not at the same time with your enemies. Blessings of Allah be on you, on your souls, on your bodies when you are visible, when you are invisible, on your perceivable aspects, on your innermost genius be it so, O Lord of the worlds.

Analysis
According to Analysis of discourse, there are three poles in the context of Ziyarat of Arba'een . The first pole is concerned with Time. In other words, Time considered as in important particular in the Ziyyarat. The ziyyarat derivates of the element of Time. In fact, determination of a special time helps to identification of the kind of religious rituals. We have two sorts of time; one concerned with text and in other word, time presented in text of Ziyyarat. The other concerned with Time but is a time in which text actualized. It is said that the latter produce a determined meaning for Shia. The time helps to make identify the process in the discourse.

See also
Arba'een Pilgrimage
Ziyarat Ashura
Battle of Karbala
Rawda Khwani
Ashura
Tasu'a

References

External links
 Ziarat Arbaeen
 Ziyarat Arbaeen

Islamic prayer
Ziyarat
Mourning of Muharram
History of Shia Islam